The Dresser is a 2015 British television drama film directed by Richard Eyre and based on the 1980 play by Ronald Harwood. It stars Ian McKellen, Anthony Hopkins, Emily Watson, Vanessa Kirby, Sarah Lancashire and Edward Fox. The story examines the relationship between an aging Shakespearean actor and his theatrical dresser, as well as the other members of his theatrical company, as he grapples with the approach of senility and irrelevance. Like the play which serves as its basis, the film's central relationship draws inspiration from Shakespeare's King Lear. The film premiered on BBC Two on 31 October 2015.

Plot

The film centres on the relationship between an ageing Shakespearean actor, named only as "Sir", and his theatrical dresser, Norman. It is set entirely in the backstage area (and briefly, the main stage) of a London playhouse during the Blitz.

It opens with a meeting between Norman and Sir's (apparent) wife, "Her Ladyship", in Sir's dressing room following a difficult visit to Sir in hospital. At Her Ladyship's frantic behest, Norman explains the events which had led to Sir's admission. He had discovered Sir wandering the streets of London during an air raid: his erratic behaviour, including trampling his hat and coat and making a public spectacle, induced Norman to take him to the hospital, despite his being scheduled for a performance of King Lear that evening. Norman regrets this, while Her Ladyship, concerned for Sir's ability to perform, considers cancelling the performance on account of illness. Norman, who has been with Sir as his dresser for nearly thirty years, and has never seen his company cancel a performance, pleads with Her Ladyship and company stage manager Madge (Sarah Lancashire) to postpone the cancellation and allow him to visit Sir in the hospital. As he begs, Sir reappears in his dressing room, having "discharged himself" from medical care.

Sir insists that he be allowed to prepare for the evening's performance, to the shock and dismay of Her Ladyship and Madge. Obviously exhausted, and approaching senility or dementia, the elderly Sir views each performance as essential to his reputation as a respected classical actor. Sir begins to prepare between bouts of amnesia and jealous weeping, accidentally blackening himself for the role of Othello instead of King Lear and forgetting the lines which begin the play; meanwhile, Norman attempts to defuse his flaring temper with silliness and reminiscing. Her Ladyship and Madge both attempt to check in on Sir, but Norman refuses to let them enter. Various members of the company, whose numbers have been dwindling with the loss of so many young actors to the war in Europe, appear for Sir's appraisal, including the pretty young actress Irene (Vanessa Kirby) toward whom Sir behaves inappropriately; demure and miscast Thornton (Edward Fox) in the role of Fool; and the standoffish Oxenby as Edmund, who refuses to "muck in" and assist with offstage production activities. Sir attempts to write in his memoirs without success.

The performance finally begins, as the sheepish but obviously attention-hungry Norman makes a fool of himself in his curtain speech warning of the air raid. As the play approaches Sir's first entrance, it is unclear whether he will be physically able to perform; however, after initially missing his cue, he begins a passionate, inspired performance of the play's most important speeches. Oxenby begrudgingly assists with the backstage sounds for the storm scene, while Norman plainly relishes any role given to him in the running of the production.

During the interval, Sir returns exhausted to his dressing room while Norman congratulates him and prepares him to sleep until his next entrance; however, Her Ladyship enters and awakens him, imploring him to retire from the stage following the performance. Sir refuses, and Her Ladyship laments his self-centred, egotistical nature and her own choice to live in his shadow. It is revealed that Sir refused to divorce his first wife for Her Ladyship because he hoped to retain eligibility for a knighthood. She threatens to leave the company and Sir forever, but Sir pleads for her not to go; when it becomes apparent Her Ladyship has relented, he turns malicious and belittles her hopes for a life outside his shadow. After she leaves, Irene attempts to enter, but Sir has her summon Madge, to whom he tells his wishes for his press clippings of theatrical reviews for his career, and to whom he gives an heirloom ring from actor Edmund Kean. Madge reveals she has loved Sir since her time at the company began, which Sir uses to assuage his wounded ego. Irene then enters, and Sir makes a sexual advance after signing a photograph for her. Norman returns and jealously listens through the door. Sir takes Irene in his arms as he would Cordelia, then casts her off; as Irene exits, Norman accosts her about what occurred, but Irene refuses to divulge any information. Norman expels her from the company, against the authority of Sir.

The play resumes, and Sir continues his exceptional performance. After the curtain falls, Sir changes out of his costume and shows some tenderness toward Norman, asking what will happen to him if Sir is unable to continue performing, an idea Norman dismisses. Thornton appears and expresses his joy at having played the principal role of Fool, extemporising on the opportunity theatre offers to even older actors. Sir becomes distant and withdrawn, dismissing Norman's attempts at cheer and preparation for the next night's performance of Richard III. Her Ladyship appears to say a spiteful goodnight, followed by Oxenby, who diminishes Sir's authority in the company. Sir becomes distraught, and Norman's attempts to comfort Sir as he lies down to sleep are largely ignored. Norman asserts that he is "never despairing," and claims to be unconcerned about his own legacy, in contrast to Sir. Sir asks Norman to read aloud the dedication to his memoirs, which contain dedications to Her Ladyship and the "spirit of all actors and those who do the work of the theatre ... and the memory of William Shakespeare"; as Norman does so, Sir dies. Norman slowly realises this, and becomes distraught and spiteful towards Sir, who has failed to mention him in the dedications. He calls for Madge, who is tender with Sir's remains. While Madge telephones Her Ladyship to give her the news, Norman secretly adds "dressers" to the list of dedications. Norman is obviously contemptuous and expresses cowardice about his own future. As Madge begins to leave in tears, Norman claims he "wouldn't give [Sir] a good character in a court of law." The two scrap, and Madge leaves distraught; Norman is left alone with Sir's body. He begins to tell one of the stories which used to cheer Sir, but stops himself.

Cast 
Ian McKellen as Norman
Anthony Hopkins as "Sir"
Emily Watson as "Her Ladyship"
Vanessa Kirby as Irene
Sarah Lancashire as Madge
Edward Fox as Thornton; Fox had played the role of Oxenby in the 1983 cinema film of the play
Tom Brooke as Oxenby / Edmond
Matthew Cottle as Albany
Ian Conningham as Kent
Helen Bradbury as Regan
John Ashton as Gloucester
Annalisa Rossi as Goneril
Carl Sanderson as Cornwall

Production
Filming began in London in March 2015.

References

External links
 

2015 television films
2015 films
2015 drama films
Remakes of British films
Films about actors
Films about old age
Films directed by Richard Eyre
Films set on the home front during World War II
Films scored by Stephen Warbeck
2010s English-language films
2010s British films
British drama television films